Abashin (masculine) or Abashina (feminine) is a Russian last name, a variant of which is Abashkin (masculine) or Abashkina (feminine). These last names derive from "" (Abasha) and "" (Abashka)—the diminutive forms of the first name Avvakum—although other theories explaining the origins of these nicknames also exist (cf. Abashev).

People with this last name
Viktoriya Abashina, contestant on Dom-2, a Russian reality show
Vladislav Abashin, actor from the 2008 Russian action movie Novaya Zemlya and the 2012 Russian drama movie In the Fog

References

Notes

Sources
Ю. А. Федосюк (Yu. A. Fedosyuk). "Русские фамилии: популярный этимологический словарь" (Russian Last Names: a Popular Etymological Dictionary). Москва, 2006. 
И. М. Ганжина (I. M. Ganzhina). "Словарь современных русских фамилий" (Dictionary of Modern Russian Last Names). Москва, 2001. 

Russian-language surnames
